Ayrshire is a registration county, and former administrative county in south-west Scotland, United Kingdom.
Ayrshire may also refer to:

Places

Australia
 Shire of Ayr, Queensland, Australia

United Kingdom
 Ayrshire (constituency), a list of places in the United Kingdom
 Ayrshire (UK Parliament constituency), a county constituency of the House of Commons of the Parliaments of Great Britain and the United Kingdom from 1708 to 1868
 Ayrshire (Parliament of Scotland constituency)
 Ayrshire and Arran, a lieutenancy area in Scotland

United States
 Ayrshire, Indiana an unincorporated community in Pike County, Indiana
 Ayrshire, Iowa, a city in Palo Alto County, Iowa

Facilities and structures
 Ayrshire Apartments, Polk County, Iowa, USA; listed on the National Register of Historic Places
 Ayrshire College, Ayrshire, Scotland, UK; a college
 Ayrshire Central Hospital, Irvine, North Ayrshire, Ayrshire, Scotland, UK

Military
 Ayrshire (Earl of Carrick's Own) Yeomanry, of the British Army
 Ayrshire Royal Horse Artillery, a volunteer force supplementing the British Army

Sports
 Ayrshire (horse), a British Thoroughbred racehorse
 Ayrshire Cup, annual soccer competition in Scotland
 Ayrshire Football Association, multiple leagues

Other uses
 Ayrshire cattle, a breed of dairy cattle originating from Ayrshire in Scotland
 Lord Lieutenant of Ayrshire

See also

 
 
 Central Ayrshire, Ayrshire, Scotland, UK
 East Ayrshire, Ayrshire, Scotland, UK
 North Ayrshire, Ayrshire, Scotland, UK
 South Ayrshire, Ayrshire, Scotland, UK
 Ayr (disambiguation)
 Ayr County (disambiguation)
 Ayr Township (disambiguation)
 Ayre (disambiguation)
 Ayrshire Hospital (disambiguation)